Necropolis Transparent is the third studio album by British deathgrind band, Lock Up. It was released on 1 July 2011 via Nuclear Blast.

Track listing

Personnel
Lock Up
Tomas Lindberg - lead vocals
Anton Reisenegger - guitar
Shane Embury - bass
Nicholas Barker - drums
Additional production
Peter Tägtgren - guest vocals
Jeffrey Walker - backing vocals
Andy Sneap - mixing
Danny Biggin - producer, engineering

2011 albums
Lock Up (British band) albums
Nuclear Blast albums